Khani Yek (also Romanized as Khānī Yek and Khānīyak; also known as Khāmīk, Khamyak, Khāneh Yak, and Khānīk) is a village in Nujin Rural District, in the Central District of Farashband County, Fars Province, Iran. At the 2006 census, its population was 764, in 161 families.

References 

Populated places in Farashband County